Sydney Punch (1864–1888) was a humorous and satirical magazine published in Sydney, New South Wales. Like Melbourne Punch and Adelaide Punch, it was modelled on Punch of London.

History 
First published in May 1864, it was the third magazine of the name to be published, the previous two having failed after a few issues. It was founded by Edgar Ray, (1828–1905), co-founder with Frederick Sinnett of Melbourne Punch.

References

External links 

 Sydney Punch – Trove newspaper listing
Sydney Punch – Dictionary of Sydney entry

1864 establishments in Australia
1888 disestablishments in Australia
Defunct magazines published in Australia
Magazines established in 1864
Magazines disestablished in 1888
Mass media in Sydney
Satirical magazines
Weekly magazines published in Australia